Ernst Stötzner (born 1952) is a German actor. He has appeared in more than sixty films since 1983.

Selected filmography

References

External links 

1952 births
Living people
German male film actors